The Alonte Sports Arena is an indoor arena in Biñan, Laguna, Philippines with the capacity of 6,500 people. It serves as the home to the Laguna Heroes of Maharlika Pilipinas Basketball League and has hosted games of the Philippine Basketball Association and the Philippine Super Liga. It also serves as an evacuation center of the city. It is located adjacent to the Biñan Football Field and the Biñan City Hall. 

The construction of the sports arena began on 2010 and was officially inaugurated on December 1, 2013. The rites were led by then Vice President Jejomar Binay and Biñan Mayor Marlyn Alonte-Naguiat.

The arena was the venue of the 2019 Asia-Oceania Floorball Cup. During the COVID-19 pandemic, it was used as a mega quarantine facility and later as a COVID-19 vaccination site of the city.

References

Volleyball venues in the Philippines
Basketball venues in the Philippines
Buildings and structures in Biñan
Sports in Laguna (province)
Sports venues completed in 2013
Indoor arenas in the Philippines